Billardiera drummondii is a slender climber in the Pittosporaceae family, native to the south-west of Western Australia, which grows in Eucalypt woodland on coastal soils.
Its flowers are blue to purple and seen in January.

In the redescription of the genus Billardiera of Cayzer, Crisp and Telford in 2004, plants in the genus are said to have:
clawed petals
petals briefly cohering
angular filaments
anther apices reflexed
non-axile placentation
fruit indehiscent
exocarp thin, leathery, not brittle
fleshy mesocarp
seeds inserted in two rows per loculus
seed insertion from top to bottom of chamber
fruit not brown
fruit apparently unilocular

References

drummondii
Flora of Western Australia
Plants described in 2004